The 1953 Nova Scotia general election was held on 26 May 1953 to elect members of the 45th House of Assembly of the Province of Nova Scotia, Canada. It was won by the Liberal party.

Results

Results by party

Results by region

Retiring incumbents
Progressive Conservative
E. Keith Potter, Digby

Nominated candidates
Legend
bold denotes party leader
† denotes an incumbent who is not running for re-election or was defeated in nomination contest

Valley

|-
|bgcolor=whitesmoke|Annapolis
||
|Henry Hicks5,00651.55%
|
|Charles F. LeBrun4,70548.45%
|
|
|
|
||
|Henry Hicks
|-
|bgcolor=whitesmoke|Clare
||
|Pierre E. Belliveau2,30758.46%
|
|Desire J. Comeau1,63941.54%
|
|
|
|
||
|Desire J. Comeau
|-
|bgcolor=whitesmoke|Digby
||
|Victor Cardoza2,77052.40%
|
|Malcolm Stewart Leonard2,51647.60%
|
|
|
|
||
|E. Keith Potter†
|-
|bgcolor=whitesmoke|Hants West
|
|Ken Eisner3,12046.37%
||
|George Henry Wilson3,60853.63%
|
|
|
|
||
|George Henry Wilson
|-
|rowspan=2 bgcolor=whitesmoke|Kings
|
|David Durell Sutton7,24524.63%
||
|George Arthur Boggs7,48125.43%
|
|
|
|
||
|David Durell Sutton
|-
|
|William H. Pipe7,04723.96%
||
|Edward Haliburton7,64225.98%
|
|
|
|
||
|William H. Pipe
|}

South Shore

|-
|rowspan=2 bgcolor=whitesmoke|Lunenburg
|
|Arthur L. Thurlow6,94021.53%
||
|R. Clifford Levy8,72727.07%
|
|Winfred Llewellyn2040.63%
|
|
||
|Arthur L. Thurlow
|-
|
|Gordon E. Romkey7,38122.90%
||
|Harley J. Spence8,74127.12%
|
|G. Boyd Crouse2410.75%
|
|
||
|Gordon E. Romkey
|-
|bgcolor=whitesmoke|Queens
|
|Merrill D. Rawding2,83845.77%
||
|W. S. Kennedy Jones3,23052.09%
|
|Claude VanBuskirk1332.14%
|
|
||
|Merrill D. Rawding
|-
|bgcolor=whitesmoke|Shelburne
||
|Wilfred Dauphinee3,25651.20%
|
|James McKay Harding3,10348.80%
|
|
|
|
||
|Wilfred Dauphinee
|-
|rowspan=2 bgcolor=whitesmoke|Yarmouth 
|
|Allan d'Entremont4,06723.59%
||
|William Heartz Brown4,85928.18%
|
|
|
|
||
|William Heartz Brown
|-
|
|Donald J. Fraser3,79021.98%
||
|Raymond Z. Bourque4,52426.24%
|
|
|
|
||
|Donald J. Fraser
|}

Fundy-Northeast

|-
|rowspan=2 bgcolor=whitesmoke|Colchester
|
|Gordon Purdy7,25524.20%
||
|Robert Stanfield7,67725.61%
|
|Harvey Curtis3241.08%
|
|
||
|Robert Stanfield
|-
|
|Hector Hill6,96323.23%
||
|George Isaac Smith7,43524.80%
|
|Sydney Parker3261.09%
|
|
||
|George Isaac Smith 
|-
|bgcolor=whitesmoke|Cumberland Centre
|
|Archibald J. Mason2,01240.65%
||
|Stephen T. Pyke2,26245.70%
|
|Florence Welton67613.66%
|
|
||
|Archibald J. Mason
|-
|bgcolor=whitesmoke|Cumberland East
|
|Martin J. Kaufman4,21448.96%
||
|James A. Langille4,39351.04%
|
|
|
|
||
|Martin J. Kaufman
|-
|bgcolor=whitesmoke|Cumberland West
||
|Allison T. Smith2,79954.55%
|
|Thomas A. Giles2,33245.45%
|
|
|
|
||
|Thomas A. Giles
|-
|bgcolor=whitesmoke|Hants East
|
|Alfred E. Reid2,25150.01%
|
|Ernest M. Ettinger2,25049.99%
|
|
|
|
||
|Ernest M. Ettinger
|}

Halifax/Dartmouth/Eastern Shore

|-
|bgcolor=whitesmoke|Halifax Centre
||
|James Edward Rutledge5,60357.69%
|
|R. Leo Simmonds4,10942.31%
|
|
|
|
||
|James Edward Rutledge
|-
|bgcolor=whitesmoke|Halifax East
||
|Geoffrey W. Stevens8,43650.83%
|
|Lt. Col. R.D. King7,19643.36%
|
|Harper Power9645.81%
|
|
||
|Geoffrey W. Stevens
|-
|bgcolor=whitesmoke|Halifax North
||
|Harold Connolly8,14861.37%
|
|Harold J. Bartlow4,48133.75%
|
|Richard J. Hardiman6484.88%
|
|
||
|Harold Connolly
|-
|bgcolor=whitesmoke|Halifax South
||
|Angus Lewis Macdonald5,75159.68%
|
|John R. Milledge3,88540.32%
|
|
|
|
||
|Angus Lewis Macdonald
|-

|bgcolor=whitesmoke|Halifax West
||
|Ronald Manning Fielding8,06151.31%
|
|Earle Haverstock6,92744.09%
|
|L.C. Wilson7234.60%
|
|
||
|Ronald Manning Fielding 
|}

Central Nova

|-
|bgcolor=whitesmoke|Antigonish 
||
|Colin H. Chisholm2,62448.92%
|
|Terrance Bernard Thompson67512.58%
|
|
|
|Vincent J. MacDonald2,06538.50%
||
|Colin H. Chisholm
|-
|bgcolor=whitesmoke|Guysborough
||
|Arthur W. MacKenzie3,47056.29%
|
|A. Grant MacDonald2,69443.71%
|
|
|
|
||
|Arthur W. MacKenzie
|-
|bgcolor=whitesmoke|Pictou Centre
||
|Alfred B. DeWolfe5,15545.41%
|
|Robert D. MacDonald4,53439.94%
|
|Donald Nicholson1,66214.64%
|
|
||
|Alfred B. DeWolfe
|-
|bgcolor=whitesmoke|Pictou East
||
|John W. MacDonald2,68148.78%
|
|William A. MacLeod2,59247.16%
|
|Joseph D. Ryan2234.06%
|
|
||
|John W. MacDonald
|-
|bgcolor=whitesmoke|Pictou West
||
|Stewart W. Proudfoot2,62850.09%
|
|Harvey Veniot2,61949.91%
|
|
|
|
||
|Stewart W. Proudfoot
|}

Cape Breton

|-
|bgcolor=whitesmoke|Cape Breton Centre
|
|Martin MacPherson2,81630.70%
|
|Charles P. Miller1,90520.77%
||
|Michael James MacDonald4,45148.53%
|
|
||
|Michael James MacDonald
|-
|bgcolor=whitesmoke|Cape Breton East
|
|Joseph McIntyre3,93437.88%
|
|William Wilton1,35613.06%
||
|Russell Cunningham5,09649.07%
|
|
||
|Russell Cunningham
|-
|bgcolor=whitesmoke|Cape Breton North
||
|Alexander O'Handley4,67447.45%
|
|John Norman MacAskill3,11531.62%
|
|Daniel Joseph MacEachern2,06220.93%
|
|
||
|Alexander O'Handley
|-
|bgcolor=whitesmoke|Cape Breton South
||
|John Smith MacIvor6,46744.67%
|
|A.O. Gunn3,38423.38%
|
|Vincent Allan Morrison4,62531.95%
|
|
||
|John Smith MacIvor
|-
|bgcolor=whitesmoke|Cape Breton West
||
|Malcolm A. Patterson3,73048.86%
|
|Edward Manson2,56233.56%
|
|Harry Munroe1,34217.58%
|
|
||
|Malcolm A. Patterson
|-
|rowspan=2 bgcolor=whitesmoke|Inverness
||
|Alexander H. McKinnon4,72529.17%
|
|Leo P. Boudreau3,58522.13%
|
|
|
|
||
|Alexander H. McKinnon
|-
||
|Roderick MacLean4,51327.86%
|
|Alex A. MacInnis3,37420.83%
|
|
|
|
||
|Roderick MacLean
|-
|bgcolor=whitesmoke|Richmond
||
|Earl Wallace Urquhart2,97058.30%
|
|Francis Whyte2,12441.70%
|
|
|
|
||
|Earl Wallace Urquhart
|-
|bgcolor=whitesmoke|Victoria
||
|Carleton L. MacMillan2,24756.47%
|
|Joseph L. MacNeil1,73243.53%
|
|
|
|
||
|Carleton L. MacMillan
|}

References

1953
Nova Scotia
1953 in Nova Scotia
May 1953 events in Canada